Alan Thomas Kelly (born 11 August 1968) is a former professional footballer who is currently goalkeeper coach at Everton. He played as a goalkeeper for Preston North End, Sheffield United and Blackburn Rovers, along with short loan spells at Stockport County and Birmingham City. Born in Preston, Kelly represented the Republic of Ireland internationally, winning 34 caps for his country. Both his father, Alan Kelly Sr., who also represented Ireland, and older brother, Gary Kelly, played as goalkeepers.

Club career
Kelly started his career at Preston North End in the Fourth Division, following the footsteps of his father, Alan Kelly Sr., and played 142 League games for the team.

He joined Sheffield United in July 1992 for £150,000. Kelly stayed with Sheffield United until 1999, despite their relegation from the Premiership shortly into his career with them. In total, he made 213 appearances for the Blades. He helped Sheffield United to the 1997-98 FA Cup semi finals at Old Trafford where they were defeated by Newcastle United. In the quarter final replay against Coventry City, the game went to a penalty shootout and Kelly saved from Dion Dublin, Simon Haworth and David Burrows to help his side progress.

In 1999, Kelly transferred to Blackburn Rovers, making 39 appearances, and stayed there until his retirement from football in 2004. This time also included loan spells at Stockport County and Birmingham City. He made more than 470 appearances in all competitions at club level.

International career
Kelly won 34 caps for the Republic of Ireland, and was a member of the Republic's 1994 and 2002 World Cup squads. He was the team's second-choice goalkeeper on both occasions (behind Packie Bonner and Shay Given respectively), and never played in a World Cup game. In 1999 he was named as FAI Senior International Player of the Year.

Later career
In the summer of 2006, Kelly was goalkeeping coach for the Soccer-Academy camps, located in Virginia, Maryland, Delaware and Pennsylvania in the United States.

He is the goalkeeping coach at Everton F.C.

After spending 18 months at Preston North End's Centre of Excellence Kelly became the new goalkeeping coach following the dismissal of Phil Brown and appointment of David Unsworth as caretaker manager. He left the post in August 2017. In October, he linked up again with Unsworth, who was the newly appointed caretaker manager of Premier League club Everton. In December 2019 he joined John Ebbrell and Francis Jeffers as the coaching team supporting caretaker manager Duncan Ferguson, who took over Evertons first team, after Marco Silva was sacked on 5 December.

Honours
Blackburn Rovers
Football League Cup: 2002

Individual
FAI Senior International Player of the Year: 1999
First Division PFA Team of the Year: 1995–96, 1996–97

See also
 List of Republic of Ireland international footballers born outside the Republic of Ireland

References

External links
 Profile of Alan Kelly

1968 births
Living people
Republic of Ireland association footballers
Republic of Ireland international footballers
Republic of Ireland under-23 international footballers
Premier League players
English Football League players
Association football goalkeepers
Preston North End F.C. players
Sheffield United F.C. players
Blackburn Rovers F.C. players
Stockport County F.C. players
Birmingham City F.C. players
1994 FIFA World Cup players
2002 FIFA World Cup players
British people of Irish descent
Preston North End F.C. non-playing staff
Everton F.C. non-playing staff
Footballers from Preston, Lancashire